Mychonia is a genus of moths in the family Geometridae. The genus was erected by Gottlieb August Wilhelm Herrich-Schäffer in 1855.

Species
Mychonia bityla H. Druce, 1892
Mychonia brunnea Warren, 1907
Mychonia cervina Warren, 1907
Mychonia corticinaria Herrich-Schäffer, 1855
Mychonia divaricata Dognin, 1906
Mychonia excisa Warren, 1906
Mychonia galanata Dognin, 1893
Mychonia graphica Warren, 1904
Mychonia infuscata Dognin, 1900
Mychonia melanospila Warren, 1907
Mychonia ochracea Dognin, 1911
Mychonia rubida Dognin, 1906
Mychonia tepida Dognin, 1900
Mychonia violacea Warren, 1907

References

Geometridae